Metarhadinorhynchus is a genus of worms belonging to the family Illiosentidae.

Species
Species:

Metarhadinorhynchus cyprini 
Metarhadinorhynchus cyprini 
Metarhadinorhynchus echeneisi 
Metarhadinorhynchus lateolabracis 
Metarhadinorhynchus thapari

References

Illiosentidae
Acanthocephala genera